Romance of a Jewess is a 1908 American silent short drama film written and directed by D. W. Griffith.

Cast
 Florence Lawrence as Ruth Simonson
 George Gebhardt as Simon Bimberg
 Gladys Egan as The Daughter
 John R. Cumpson as Customer
 Guy Hedlund
 Arthur V. Johnson as In Bookstore/Matchmaker
 Alfred Paget
 Mack Sennett as Customer/In Bookstore/Doctor
 Harry Solter as Customer/Rubinstein

References

External links
 
 
Romance of a Jewess available for free download at Internet Archive

1908 films
1908 drama films
Silent American drama films
American silent short films
Biograph Company films
American black-and-white films
Films directed by D. W. Griffith
1908 short films
Articles containing video clips
1900s American films